Arriën is a hamlet in the Dutch province of Overijssel. It is a part of the municipality of Ommen, and lies about 22 km south of Hoogeveen.

It was first mentioned between 1294 and 1295 as "domus Theoderici de Arien", and means "plowed field". In 1840, it was home to 211 people.

References

External link

Populated places in Overijssel
Ommen